High affinity copper uptake protein 1 (CTR1) is a protein that in humans is encoded by the SLC31A1 gene.

Copper is an element essential for life, but excessive copper can be toxic or even lethal to the cell. Therefore, cells have developed sophisticated ways to maintain a critical copper balance, with the intake, export, and intracellular compartmentalization or buffering of copper strictly regulated. The 2 related genes ATP7A and ATP7B, responsible for the human diseases Menkes syndrome and Wilson disease, respectively, are involved in copper export. In S. cerevisiae, the copper uptake genes CTR1, CTR2, and CTR3 have been identified, and in human the CTR1 and CTR2 (MIM 603088) genes have been identified.

Clinical significance
In 2022, a new autosomal-recessive disease was discovered that is caused by mutations of the CTR1 gene. The disease is characterized by profound deficiency of copper in the central nervous system and presents with infantile seizures and neurodegeneration.

See also
 Solute carrier family

References

Further reading

Solute carrier family